is an underground metro station located in Meitō-ku, Nagoya, Aichi Prefecture, Japan operated by the Nagoya Municipal Subway's Higashiyama Line. It is located 17.5 rail kilometers from the terminus of the Higashiyama Line at Takabata Station.

History
Issha Station was opened on 1 April 1969.

Lines

 (Station number: H19)

Layout
Issha Station has two underground opposed side platforms.

Platforms

External links
 Issha Station official web site

References

Railway stations in Japan opened in 1969
Railway stations in Aichi Prefecture